is a Japanese professional footballer who plays as a goalkeeper for Gamba Osaka and the Japan national football team. He previously played for Albirex Niigata.

Club career

A native of Osaka, Higashiguchi spent time in Gamba Osaka's youth system prior to entering university, first at the Fukui University of Technology and later at the Niigata University of Management where he represented their football team in the 2008 Emperor's Cup.

After graduating from university, Higashiguchi signed his first professional contract with then J1 League outfit Albirex Niigata. He spent five seasons with the men from the Japan Sea coast and played a total of 84 league games before returning to Osaka in 2014.

Gamba Osaka had just been promoted back to J1 League following their shock relegation in 2012, when they acquired Higashiguchi to be their new first-choice goalkeeper ahead of the 2014 campaign. Things could not have got off to a better start for him at his new club as they went on to lift the J1 League title, the J.League Cup and the Emperor's Cup. The Osaka giants followed that up by winning the 2015 Japanese Super Cup and Emperor's Cup trophies, defeating Urawa Red Diamonds in the final of both competitions, as well as reaching the semi-finals of the AFC Champions League before going down to Guangzhou Evergrande over two legs in the semi finals. Higashiguchi played 55 times in all competitions in 2015 adding to the 50 appearances he made in 2014.

Gamba did not win any silverware between 2016 and 2018, however, Higashiguchi remained the undisputed first-choice between the sticks; he was an ever present during the 2016 league campaign before missing 1 and 5 league games respectively due to injury in the 2017 and 2018 seasons.

International career
On 23 July 2015, Japan's coach Vahid Halilhodžić called him up to the national team for the first time ahead of the upcoming 2015 EAFF East Asian Cup. He debuted against China, in the last match of the tournament, a 1-1 draw.

His next international involvement would come in a World Cup qualifier at home to Afghanistan in March 2016. The match would see Higashiguchi keep his first clean sheet for the national team as Japan ran out 5-0 winners. After this is would be another 19 months before his next cap in a 3–3 draw in a friendly match at home to Haiti on 10 October 2017. Two months later he was named in the squad for the 2017 EAFF E-1 Football Championship in his home country. Like two years previously, his only involvement was in a match against China which Japan won this time 2–1 to help themselves to the runners-up spot in the tournament behind South Korea.

He was named in Japan's squad for the 2018 FIFA World Cup in Russia., but did not play in any of the team's matches as Eiji Kawashima started all four of their games. He did, however, play in a pre-tournament friendly against Paraguay on 12 June, the match ending in a 4–2 Japanese victory. He played a further 2 international matches in 2018, the home friendly victories over Costa Rica in October and Uruguay in November.

He was named in the final Japan squad for the 2019 AFC Asian Cup in the United Arab Emirates in January 2019 alongside fellow goalkeepers Shūichi Gonda and Daniel Schmidt, however, like the World Cup 6 months earlier he did not make any appearances.

Career statistics

Club
.

International

Honors
Gamba Osaka
J. League Division 1: 2014
Emperor's Cup: 2014, 2015
J. League Cup: 2014
Japanese Super Cup: 2015

Japan
AFC Asian Cup runner-up: 2019

References

External links

Masaaki Higashiguchi – Yahoo! Japan competition record 

1986 births
Living people
Fukui University of Technology alumni
Niigata University of Management alumni
Association football people from Osaka Prefecture
Japanese footballers
Japan international footballers
J1 League players
Albirex Niigata players
Gamba Osaka players
2015 AFC Asian Cup players
Association football goalkeepers
2018 FIFA World Cup players
People from Takatsuki, Osaka
2019 AFC Asian Cup players